McColl is a surname of Irish and Scottish origin. It is shared by several notable people and fictional characters:
 Bill McColl (born 1930), former American football (NFL) player
 Billy McColl, Scottish footballer
 Colin McColl (born 1932), KCMG, former head of the British Secret Intelligence Service
 Hugh McColl (born 1935), Fourth generation American banker, influential in evolution of the banking industry
 Ian McColl (1927–2008), Scottish international footballer and manager
 James McColl (disambiguation)
 James McColl (musician) (fl. 1990), Scottish frontman for the British band The Supernaturals
 James McColl (politician) (1844–1929)
 Jim McColl (born 1951), Scottish businessman
 Jimmy McColl (footballer born 1892), Scottish footballer (Celtic FC, Stoke City FC, Hibernian FC)
 Jimmy McColl (Olympic footballer), Scottish footballer
 John B. McColl (Canadian politician) (1861–1940), Canadian national political figure
 John McColl (British Army officer) (born 1952), KCB, CBE, DSO, Deputy Supreme Allied Commander Europe
 John McColl (politician) (fl. 1915), Canadian (Alberta) political figure
 Milt McColl (born 1959), former American football (NFL) player
 Pamela McColl, Canadian publisher and campaigner
 Peter McColl (born 1980), Former Rector of the University of Edinburgh
 Robert Smyth McColl (1876–1959), Scottish footballer and founder of the RS McColl newsagent chain
 Siobhan McColl (born 1991), South African figure skater
 William McColl (disambiguation)
 William McColl (clarinetist)
 William McColl (footballer) (1865 – after 1895), Scottish international footballer

Fictional characters
 Mitch McColl, character on the Australian soap opera Home and Away

See also
 MacColl